The Church of Sancti Spiritus (Spanish: Iglesia de Sancti Spiritus) is a church located in Salamanca, Spain. It was declared Bien de Interés Cultural in 1888.

See also 

 List of Bien de Interés Cultural in the Province of Salamanca

References 

Bien de Interés Cultural landmarks in the Province of Salamanca
Churches in Castile and León